Leiocolea is a genus of liverworts belonging to the family Jungermanniaceae.

The genus was first described by Karl Müller.

The species of this genus are found in Eurasia and Northern America.

Species:
 Leiocolea badensis (Gottsche) Jörg.

References

Jungermanniales
Jungermanniales genera